is a Japanese backstroke swimmer.

Major achievements
 2005 World Championships – 100m backstroke 6th (1:01.95)
 2006 Pan Pacific Swimming Championships – 100m backstroke 1st (1:00.63)
 2008 Beijing Olympics – 100m backstroke 8th (1:00.16)

Personal bests
In long course
 100m backstroke: 59.83 (Apr 17, 2008)

In short course
 200m backstroke: 2:03.01 Asian, Japanese Record (February 21, 2009)

See also
 Reiko Nakamura
 Aya Terakawa

References

External links
 Profile – JOC

1985 births
Living people
Japanese female backstroke swimmers
Olympic swimmers of Japan
Swimmers at the 2008 Summer Olympics
Swimmers at the 2012 Summer Olympics
Sportspeople from Saitama (city)
Asian Games medalists in swimming
Swimmers at the 2010 Asian Games
Asian Games silver medalists for Japan
Asian Games bronze medalists for Japan
Medalists at the 2010 Asian Games
20th-century Japanese women
21st-century Japanese women